Gustavo Daniel Cabral  (born 14 October 1985) is an Argentine professional footballer who plays as a centre-back for Liga MX club Pachuca.

Club  career
Born in Isidro Casanova, Cabral made his first team debut in 2003 for Racing Club. He played 112 games for Racing until 2008, when he joined River Plate. Cabral was a first team regular in River's defense during the Torneo Clausura 2008 won by the club.

After being highly contested by River's supporters, Cabral moved abroad, joining Mexican club Tecos F.C. in June 2010. Despite being a regular with the Mexican side, he returned to his country in the following year, signing with Arsenal de Sarandí.

On 10 August 2011, Cabral was loaned to La Liga side Levante UD in a season-long deal. He made his division debut on 3 December, coming on as a second-half substitute in a 0–5 away loss against FC Barcelona. On 13 June 2012, Cabral was loaned to fellow top-divisioner Celta de Vigo. He signed permanently with the Celestes in the 2013 summer.

On 14 June 2019, after seven years with Celta, Cabral left for Mexican side C.F. Pachuca.

International career
In 2005 Cabral was part of the Argentina U20 team that won the 2005 FIFA World Youth Championship. In 2007 Cabral was called up to the national team for a friendly against Chile but did not feature in the match.

Career statistics

Honours
River Plate
Argentine Primera División: 2008 Clausura

Pachuca
Liga MX: Apertura 2022

Argentina U20
FIFA U-20 World Cup: 2005

Individual
Liga MX All-Star: 2022

References

External links
 
 Football-Lineups profile
 Argentine Primera statistics at Futbol XXI  
 

1985 births
Living people
People from La Matanza Partido
Argentine people of Portuguese descent
Argentine footballers
Argentina under-20 international footballers
Association football defenders
Argentine Primera División players
Liga MX players
La Liga players
Club Atlético River Plate footballers
Racing Club de Avellaneda footballers
Tecos F.C. footballers
Levante UD footballers
RC Celta de Vigo players
Argentine expatriate footballers
Argentine expatriate sportspeople in Spain
Expatriate footballers in Mexico
Expatriate footballers in Spain
Sportspeople from Buenos Aires Province